Stories from the Chestnut Woods is a 2019 Slovenian drama film directed by Gregor Božič. It premiered at the 2019 Toronto International Film Festival (TIFF) in September 2019 and was selected as the Slovenian entry for the Best International Feature Film at the 93rd Academy Awards, but it was not nominated.

Plot
Shortly after World War II, in a forest between Italy and Yugoslavia, a carpenter and a chestnut seller share stories.

Cast
 Massimo De Francovich as Mario
 Ivana Roščić as Marta
Tomi Janežič as dr. Toni
Giusi Merli as Dora

See also
 List of submissions to the 93rd Academy Awards for Best International Feature Film
 List of Slovenian submissions for the Academy Award for Best International Feature Film

References

External links
 

2019 films
2019 drama films
Slovenian drama films
Slovene-language films
2010s Italian-language films